In the NUTS (Nomenclature of Territorial Units for Statistics) codes of Italy (IT), the three levels are:

NUTS codes

The following codes have been discontinued:
 ITC45 (Milano) was split into ITC4C and ITC4D.
 ITD (Northeast Italy) became ITH.
 ITE (Central Italy) became ITI.
 ITF41 (Foggia) and ITF42 (Bari) were split into ITF46, ITF47, and ITF48.
 ITG21 (Sassari), ITG22 (Nuoro), ITG23 (Oristano), and ITG24 (Cagliari) were split into the current divisions of ITG2.

Local administrative units

Below the NUTS levels, the two LAU (Local Administrative Units) levels are:

The LAU codes of Italy can be downloaded here: ''

See also
 Subdivisions of Italy
 ISO 3166-2 codes of Italy
 FIPS region codes of Italy

References

Sources
 Hierarchical list of the Nomenclature of territorial units for statistics - NUTS and the Statistical regions of Europe
 Overview map of EU Countries - NUTS level 1
 ITALIA - NUTS level 2
 ITALIA - NUTS level 3
 Correspondence between the NUTS levels and the national administrative units
 List of current NUTS codes
 Download current NUTS codes (ODS format)
 Provinces of Italy, Statoids.com

Italy
Nuts